The Owens Valley Group is a geologic group in California. It preserves fossils dating back to the Permian period.

See also

 List of fossiliferous stratigraphic units in California
 Paleontology in California

References
 

Geologic groups of California
Permian System of North America